It Ain’t What U Wear, It’s How U Play It is the second and final album from Another Bad Creation. It was released on September 21, 1993 on Motown Records.

Chart performance
The album was a commercial failure, as it failed to enter any Billboard chart. Two singles were released from the album: “I Don't Wanna Be Grown Up” and “Where's Ya Little Sista?”; these singles also failed to enter the charts. Due to the album's failure, the group disbanded shortly after.

Track listing

 Got It Goin’ On (Kelley, Killings, Wales, Witcher) - 4:34
 Where's Ya Little Sista? (Bivins, Kornegay, Wales, Whittington) - 4:07
 Keep Steppin’ On (Rhymes) - 5:00
 One More Try (Morris) - 4:31
 I Don't Wanna Be Grown Up (Austin, Kelley, Robinson, Wales) - 4:46
 My First Kiss (Kelley, Robinson, Wales) - 4:46
 Show Me the Way (Morris, Stockman) - 4:36
 Strive to Be (Rhymes) - 4:13
 Throw Ya Palms (Velasquez, Wright) - 3:53

References

1993 singles
1993 albums
Another Bad Creation albums
Albums produced by Tim & Bob